Mataragka or Mataranga (Greek: Ματαράγκα) may refer to several places in Greece:

Mataragka, Achaea, a village in the municipal unit Larissos, Achaea 
Mataragka, Aetolia-Acarnania, a village in the municipal unit Arakynthos, Aetolia-Acarnania
Mataragka, Karditsa, a village in the municipal unit Arni, Karditsa regional unit